Criterion, or its plural form criteria, may refer to:

General
 Criterion, Oregon, a historic unincorporated community in the United States
 Criterion Place, a proposed skyscraper in West Yorkshire, England
 Criterion Restaurant, in London, England
 Criterion Stakes, a horse race in Newmarket, England
 Criterion Summit, a mountain pass in Oregon, United States
 Criterion Wind Project, a wind farm in Maryland, United States

Science and mathematics
 Criteria air contaminants, air pollutants that cause smog, acid rain, and other health hazards
Criterion validity, in psychometrics, a measure of how well one variable or set of variables predicts an outcome
Criterion-referenced test, translates a test score into a statement about the behavior to be expected of a person
Eisenstein's criterion, in mathematics, gives sufficient conditions for a polynomial to be irreducible over the rational numbers
Euler's criterion, in number theory concerning primes
Problem of the criterion, in epistemology, an issue regarding the starting point of knowledge
Weyl's criterion, used in mathematics in the theory of diophantine approximation

Publishing
Criterion (journal), the first philosophy journal in Catalan, published from 1925 to 1969
The Criterion,  a British literary magazine published from 1922 to 1939
The Criterion (American magazine), a New York-based literary magazine published from 1896 to 1905
Jewish Criterion, a weekly newspaper in Pittsburgh, United States
The New Criterion, a New York-based monthly literary magazine founded in 1982

Entertainment
Criteria (band), an indie rock band from Omaha, Nebraska
Criteria Studios, recording studio in Miami, Florida
The Criterion Collection, a company that produces collector's edition DVDs and Blu-ray discs
Criterion Games, a video game developer in Guildford, England

Companies
Criteria CaixaCorp, an investment holding company.
Criterion Capital Partners, a global company which runs the social network Bebo

See also
Information criterion (disambiguation)
Criterion Theatre (disambiguation)
Criterium, bicycle race
Surat Al-Furqan (The Criterion, The Standard) is the 25th sura of the Qur'an
Kriterion, a peer-reviewed journal of philosophy